Marios Christodoulou (born 4 July 1974) is a Cypriot football midfielder who is under contract for Nikos & Sokratis Erimis. In the past he played for APOP Kinyras Peyia, AEL FC, Iraklis F.C., Aris Thessaloniki F.C., Akratitos, Nea Salamina, APEP Pitsilia and Ermis Aradippou.

External links
 

Living people
1974 births
Nea Salamis Famagusta FC players
AEL Limassol players
Aris Thessaloniki F.C. players
Iraklis Thessaloniki F.C. players
APOP Kinyras FC players
APEP FC players
Ermis Aradippou FC players
Cypriot footballers
Cyprus international footballers
Association football midfielders
AEZ Zakakiou managers
AEZ Zakakiou players
Nikos & Sokratis Erimis FC players
Cypriot football managers
Footballers from Athens
Greek footballers